Bruno Cassinari (29 October 1912 – 26 March 1992) was an Italian painter and sculptor who worked in a style that mixed cubist and expressionist elements.

Biography
Cassinari was born in Piacenza. He attended the local art school but eventually decided to move to Milan, where he studied painting at the Brera Academy under Aldo Carpi. In 1946, he helped found the Fronte Nuovo delle Arti, an association aiming to restore optimism to post-war Italian art. Other members were Renato Birolli, Renato Guttuso, Ennio Morlotti, Leoncillo Leonardi, and Alberto Viani.

In 1949, Cassinari was invited by Pablo Picasso to exhibit his work at the Antibes Museum of Art. In 1952 he won the Grand Prize for Painting at the 26th Venice Biennale with his Cubist-inspired paintings The Lemon and Still Life in Pink. In the 1960s Cassinari briefly relocated to Venice. In 1986 he was recognized for his contributions to Italian painting with a large-scale retrospective of his work in Milan. Cassinari died in Milan on March 26, 1992, about one year after the death of his wife, Enrica.

References

1912 births
1992 deaths
20th-century Italian painters
Italian male painters
20th-century Italian sculptors
20th-century Italian male artists
Italian male sculptors
Brera Academy alumni
People from Piacenza